The second round of the women's individual pursuit of the 2008–2009 UCI Track Cycling World Cup Classics took place in Melbourne, Australia on 20 November 2008. 14 athletes participated in the contest.

Competition format
The women's individual pursuit consists of a 3 km time trial race between two riders, starting on opposite sides of the track. If one rider catches the other, the race is over.

The tournament consisted of an initial qualifying round.  The top two riders in the qualifying round advanced to the gold medal match and the third and fourth riders advanced to the bronze medal race.

Schedule
Thursday 20 November
13:35-14:15 Qualifying
20:15-20:30 Finals
20:40:-20:45 Victory Ceremony

Schedule from Tissottiming.com

Results

Qualifying

Results from Tissottiming.com.

Finals

Final bronze medal race

Results from Tissottiming.com.

Final gold medal race

Results from Tissottiming.com.

World Cup Standings
General standings after 2 of 5 2008–2009 World Cup races.

Results from Tissottiming.com.

See also
 2008–2009 UCI Track Cycling World Cup Classics – Round 2 – Women's points race
 2008–2009 UCI Track Cycling World Cup Classics – Round 2 – Women's scratch
 UCI Track Cycling World Cup Classics – Women's individual pursuit

References

Round 2 Womens individual pursuit
UCI Track Cycling World Cup Classics Round 2 Womens individual pursuit
UCI Track Cycling World Cup – Women's individual pursuit